1909 (Devanagari:एकोणविसशे नऊ) is a 2014 Marathi movie based on the assassination of British officer Arthur Jackson by Anant Kanhere. Directed by Abhay Kambli, the film is set in the year 1909, during the period of British dominion over India and focuses on the young revolutionaries' efforts to drive the British out of the country and gain freedom. But it's not just one's spirit that plays an important role here. It takes proper execution of a plan to bring success, and then, laying down your life for the country doesn't seem a difficult task anymore.

Plot
Anant Kanhere (Akshay Shimpi) is a young lad from a small village in Konkan who goes to Aurangabad to pursue studies. Influenced by Lokmanya Tilak and Vinayak Savarkar's ideologies, Anant decides to contribute to the freedom struggle. Meanwhile, in Nashik, Krushnaji Karve (Shrikant Bhide) and his aides are preparing for an armed rebellion, but it is their mentor Ganesh Savarkar who advises them to wait for the right moment to strike. The root cause of everyone's anger is the collector of Nashik, Officer Jackson who has invited the wrath of people through his actions. And when he orders the arrest of Ganesh, Krushnaji and his group including Anant get into motion to execute Jackson's assassination.

External links
Times of India Movie review

2014 films
2010s Marathi-language films